This is a list of games that used to be played by children, some of which are still being played today. Traditional children's games do not include commercial products such as board games but do include games which require props such as hopscotch or marbles (toys go in List of toys unless the toys are used in multiple games or the single game played is named after the toy; thus "jump rope" is a game, while "Jacob's ladder" is a toy). Despite being transmitted primarily through word of mouth due to not being considered suitable for academic study or adult attention, traditional games have, "not only failed to disappear but have also evolved over time into new versions."

Traditional children's games are defined, "as those that are played informally with minimal equipment, that children learn by example from other children, and that can be played without reference to written rules. These games are usually played by children between the ages of 7 and 12, with some latitude on both ends of the age range." "Children's traditional games (also called folk games) are those that are passed from child to child, generation to generation, informally by word of mouth," and most children's games include at least two of the following six features in different proportion: physical skill, strategy, chance, repetition of patterns, creativity, and vertigo.

Tag games

Hiding games 
 Hide-and-go-seek
 Sardines

Games with equipment

Jumping games 
 Ampe, from Ghana
 Double Dutch (jump rope)
 Hopscotch
 Jumping Jacks
 Jumping rope (Skipping rope)
 Jumpsies (also known as Chinese jump rope, elastics, or gummitwist)
 Leapfrog

Memory games 
 Chinese whispers (Telephone)
 Concentration
 Here Comes an Old Soldier from Botany Bay (Old Soldier)
 I packed my bag
 Kim's Game

Parlour games 
 Hunt the Thimble (Hot and Cold)
 Huckle buckle beanstalk (Hot buttered beans)
 I spy
 Truth or Dare?
 Wink Murder

Hand games

Other traditional children's games

See also
Paper-and-pencil games
Street games

Notes

References

Games
Children's
Children's, List of